Guðmundur Þór Kárason (born 14 June 1974) is an Icelandic puppet designer and puppeteer who is best known for his work on LazyTown.

Born in Reykjavík, Iceland, Guðmundur is the son of director Kári H. Þórsson and visual artist Jenný E. Guðmundsdóttir. In 1994, he founded Wit Puppets in Iceland, working on commercials, theater and television programs. Guðmundur's involvement in Wit Puppets ranges from character development, construction and performing some of the puppets himself.

In 1998, Guðmundur joined Lazy Shows, performing and consulting on the show as well as designing visuals for the company.

Starting in 2004, Guðmundur was one of the founders of LTS Garðbær Studios (also known as LazyTown Entertainment), puppet performer and voice of Ziggy in LazyTown. In 2010, he was a photographer for the Eurovision Song Contest. In 2011, he was the director and producer for the postcards of the Junior Eurovision Song Contest 2011 in the Armenian capital Yerevan.

References

External links
 
   Official [archived] website

1974 births
People from Reykjavík
Living people
20th-century Icelandic male artists
21st-century Icelandic male artists
Puppeteers